The 2020 NPF College Draft was to have been the 17th annual collegiate draft for the National Pro Fastpitch. It was scheduled to take place on March 30, 2020 in Rosemont, Illinois, however, on March 16, 2020, the draft was postponed indefinitely due to the coronavirus pandemic.

The Canadian Wild opted not to participate in the draft, preferring to play with only their players who will be on their Olympic softball team. As an expansion team, California Commotion has been granted the first draft pick in each round, and an extra, fifth pick in each of the fourth and fifth rounds.

Draft Selections 

Position key: 
C = catcher; INF = infielder; SS = shortstop; OF = outfielder; UT = Utility infielder; P = pitcher; RHP = right-handed pitcher; LHP = left-handed pitcher
Positions will be listed as combined for those who can play multiple positions.

Round 1

Round 2

Round 3

Round 4

Round 5

Draft notes
Round 1:

References 

2020 in softball
National Pro Fastpitch drafts
Softball in the United States
NPF Draft, 2020